Yeoh Li Tian (born 1999) is a Malaysian chess player. He was awarded the title International Master by FIDE in 2017.

Chess career
Yeoh won the Malaysian Chess Championship in 2015 and 2016. In 2017 he won the FIDE Zone 3.3 Championship on tiebreak from Nguyễn Ngọc Trường Sơn. Thanks to this victory, Yeoh received an automatical award of the title International Master. He also achieved a norm for the title Grandmaster, the first ever by a Malaysian, and became the first Malaysian ever to qualify to play in the FIDE World Cup. In this latter event, held in Batumi later in the same year, Yeoh was eliminated by former world champion Viswanathan Anand in the first round.

In the 2019 Philippines Southeast Asian Games, Yeoh delivered Malaysia’s first ever Rapid Chess gold in the Sea Games.

Personal life 
Yeoh is a former student of SMJK Katholik. He is currently studying Mathematics at Imperial College London.

References

External links 
 
 Yeoh Li Tian chess games at 365Chess.com
 

1999 births
Living people
Chess International Masters
Malaysian chess players
Southeast Asian Games gold medalists for Malaysia
Competitors at the 2019 Southeast Asian Games
Date of birth missing (living people)
Place of birth missing (living people)
20th-century Malaysian people
21st-century Malaysian people